Azov was a  missile cruiser of the Soviet and later Russian Navy.

History 
Azov was laid down on 21 July 1972, launched on 14 September 1973 and was commissioned on 25 December 1975. The ship was stationed in the Black Sea Fleet. In 1977 the ship was modified to carry the new S-300F (SA-N-6) anti-air missile complex.

After the collapse of the Soviet Union the ship became a part of the Russian Navy. There the cruiser served until 1998, when the ship was decommissioned and scrapped in 2000.

References 
 Sevastopol.info- Large ASW destroyer Azov

Kara-class cruisers
Ships built at Shipyard named after 61 Communards
1975 ships
Ships built in the Soviet Union
Cold War cruisers of the Soviet Union